A zoot suit is a style of clothing first popular in the 1930s and 1940s.

Zoot suit may also refer to:
Zoot Suit (play), a 1979 Broadway play by Luis Valdez
Zoot Suit (film), a 1981 filmed version of the play
"Zoot Suit" (song), a 1964 song by The High Numbers, an alternate name for The Who

See also
The Zoot Suit Murders, 1978 murder mystery by Thomas Sanchez
Zoot Suit Riots, a series of conflicts in June 1943 in Los Angeles, California, United States
Zoot Suit Riot (album), by the Cherry Poppin' Daddies
"Zoot Suit Riot" (song), the album's title song
Zoot (disambiguation)